Memphis Blood: The Sun Sessions is an album by American guitarist James Blood Ulmer recorded in and released on the Hyena label in 2001. The album features Ulmer covering fourteen blues standards recorded at Sun Studio.

Reception
The Allmusic review by Thom Jurek awarded the album 4 stars, and stated, "some of the greasiest, knottiest, most surreal blues music ever... Memphis Blood is a fresh injection of blues truth... Ulmer delivers here, big time".

Track listing
 "Spoonful" (Willie Dixon) - 2:58
 "I Want to Be Loved" (Dixon) - 3:15
 "Little Red Rooster" (Dixon) - 4:22
 "Dimples" (James Bracken, John Lee Hooker) - 3:31
 "I Just Want to Make Love to You" (Dixon) - 3:30
 "Evil"  Willy Dixon - 2:50
 "Death Letter" (Son House) - 9:41
 "Fattening Frogs for Snakes" (Willie Williamson) - 2:51
 "Money" (Hooker) - 3:34
 "I Love the Life I Live, I Live the Life I Love" (Dixon) - 3:30
 "Too Lazy to Work, Too Nervous to Steal" (Daylie Holmes, Marl H. Young) - 2:36
 "Double Trouble" (Otis Rush) - 4:56
 "I Asked for Water (She Gave Me Gasoline)" (Chester Burnett) - 8:25
 "Back Door Man" (Dixon) - 3:18
Recorded at Sun Studio, Memphis, Tennessee on April 10, 11 & 12, 2001

Personnel
James Blood Ulmer - guitar, vocals
Vernon Reid - guitar
Charles Burnham - violin
Rick Steff - piano, wurlitzer electric piano, hammond B3 organ
David Barnes - harmonica
Mark Peterson - bass
Aubrey Dayle - drums

References

External links
 

Hyena Records albums
James Blood Ulmer albums
2001 albums